Vologes Ridge (‘Hrebet Vologes’ \'hre-bet 'vo-lo-ges\) is the ice-covered flat-topped ridge extending 5.85 km in east-west direction, 1.55 km wide and rising to 1234 m at its west extremity, situated in central Sleipnir Glacier on Foyn Coast, Antarctic Peninsula.

The feature is named after the Thracian priest and military leader Vologes (1st century BC).

Location
British mapping in 1976.

Maps
 British Antarctic Territory.  Scale 1:200000 topographic map. DOS 610 Series, Sheet W 66 64.  Directorate of Overseas Surveys, Tolworth, UK, 1976.
 Antarctic Digital Database (ADD). Scale 1:250000 topographic map of Antarctica. Scientific Committee on Antarctic Research (SCAR). Since 1993, regularly upgraded and updated.

Notes

References
 Vologes Ridge. SCAR Composite Antarctic Gazetteer.
 Bulgarian Antarctic Gazetteer. Antarctic Place-names Commission. (details in Bulgarian, basic data in English)

External links
 Vologes Ridge. Copernix satellite image

Ridges of Graham Land
Foyn Coast
Bulgaria and the Antarctic